HBM Iqbal is a Bangladesh Awami League politician and former Member of Parliament from Ramna-Tejgaon, Dhaka.

Biography
Iqbal was elected from Dhaka-10 in 1996. He faced criticism after shots were fired from his rally on a rally of then opposition party, Bangladesh Nationalist Party, in  2001.  Four people in the Bangladesh Nationalist Party rally were killed in the shooting. He was charged in 2003, but the case was dropped in 2010 after the Ministry of Home Affairs recommended charges be dropped in 2009.

In 2007, he was charged with corruption by the Bangladesh Anti Corruption Commission (ACC). The High Court acquitted him in 2011. The ACC filed a petition against the acquittal but in 2015 dropped their petition. He has sent more than 30 legal notices to bdnews24.com to remove past articles on criminal cases against him.

As of 2010, he was a vice-president of the Awami League's Dhaka city unit. He is the chairman of Premier Group of Companies. He is also the chairman of Premier Bank Limited.

References

Awami League politicians
Bangladeshi businesspeople
Living people
Year of birth missing (living people)